Dirty is the fourth album from singer-songwriter-guitarist Malina Moye. The album was released worldwide on March 17, 2023 to critical acclaim. The theme of the album is "taking the high road when others do you wrong, which is so hard to do" states Moye in an AXS TV interview. 

The album continues with Moye's signature sound of blues, rock, pop, and soul. Guitar Player Magazine called the instrumental single "F.I.N.E." a "blues-rock opus." . The music video for "F.I.N.E" was released on March 13, 2023. 

The album's first single "Say My Name" was released on January 18, 2023, with the music video directed by award-winning filmmaker Marc Fusco.

Currently in the March 2023 print issue on news stands, American Songwriter Magazine states that "it's a nine-track surge through emotive blues instrumentals like "F.I.N.E.", flirtatious songs like "Obsexxed", nods to past greats like her cover of Led Zeppelin's "D'yer Mak'er" and pronouncements like "What Do You Stand For".

While promoting the album, Moye played the national anthem for the Vikings vs Colts game at US Bank Stadium in Minneapolis which is now considered the biggest comeback game in NFL history. All the tracks on Dirty were written by Malina Moye with the exception of D'yer Mak'er, and produced by Bjorn "Polarbear" Soderberg and Moye as well.

Track listing

 "Y.A.T.O (You Ain't The One)" - 3:38
 "F.I.N.E (F*cked up, Insecure, Neurotic, and Emotionally unstable)" – 4:43
 "Over Ur Lies" – 3:43
 "Say My Name" – 3:52
 "D’yer Mak’er" – 4:16
 "Courage"  – 5:51
 "Dirty" – 3:11
 "Obsexxed" – 3:16
 "What Do You Stand For"  – 6:42

References

2023 albums
Malina Moye albums